Taquarussu may refer to

 Taquarussu, Tocantins, a village in the state of Tocantins, Brazil
 Taquarussu, Mato Grosso do Sul, a municipality of the state of Mato Grosso do Sul, Brazil